St. Michael Catholic Secondary School, is a Catholic high school located in Bolton, Ontario.  The school is administered by the Dufferin-Peel Catholic District School Board.

Like other members of the district, students who attend St. Michael receive teaching on religion, family life and prayer in addition to the standard curriculum found in public schools.

See also
List of high schools in Ontario

References

High schools in the Regional Municipality of Peel
Catholic secondary schools in Ontario
Educational institutions established in 2010
2010 establishments in Ontario